Filip Mrzljak (born 16 April 1993) is a Croatian professional footballer who plays as a defensive midfielder for Croatian Football League club HNK Gorica.

Club career

He joined Dinamo București in June 2019. He left the club after only one season.

On 10 December 2022, Mrzljak signed a one-and-a-half-year contract with Croatian Football League club HNK Gorica, after leaving FC Ufa as a free agent in July 2022.

Honours
Astra Giurgiu
Cupa României: Runner-up 2018–19

Career statistics

References

External links

Filip Mrzljak  at Sportnet.hr 

1993 births
Living people
Footballers from Zagreb
Association football midfielders
Association football defenders
Croatian footballers
Croatia youth international footballers
Croatia under-21 international footballers
NK Sesvete players
NK Lokomotiva Zagreb players
CS Pandurii Târgu Jiu players
FC Astra Giurgiu players
FC Dinamo București players
FC Ufa players
First Football League (Croatia) players
Croatian Football League players
Liga I players
Russian Premier League players
Croatian expatriate footballers
Expatriate footballers in Romania
Croatian expatriate sportspeople in Romania
Expatriate footballers in Russia
Croatian expatriate sportspeople in Russia